Blackmore is an outer rural locality in Darwin. It is adjacent to the Blackmore River.

References

External links

Suburbs of Darwin, Northern Territory